Eise may refer to:

People with the given name
 Eise Eisinga (1744–1828), Frisian amateur astronomer

People with the surname
 David Eise (born 1965), retired American soccer defender
 Ida Eise (1891–1978), New Zealand artist and art teacher
 Steve Eise, retired American soccer player